Aliabad-e Puzeh Rowghan Cheraghi (also Romanized as ‘Alīābād-e Pūzeh Rowghan Cherāghī; also known as ‘Alīābād) is a village in Hashivar Rural District, in the Central District of Darab County, Fars Province, Iran. At the 2006 census, its population was 189, in 43 families.

References 

Populated places in Darab County